Thomas Patrick Moore (1797 – July 21, 1853) was a U.S. Representative from Kentucky.

Born in Charlotte County, Virginia, Moore attended the common schools. He moved with his parents to Harrodsburg, Kentucky. He attended Transylvania University, Lexington, Kentucky. He served in the War of 1812. He served as captain in the Twelfth Virginia Infantry March 12, 1812 and a major in the Eighteenth Infantry September 20, 1813. He was honorably discharged on June 15, 1815. He served as member of the Kentucky House of Representatives in 1819 and 1820. He owned slaves.

Moore was elected as a Jackson Republican to the Eighteenth Congress and re-elected as a Jacksonian candidate to the Nineteenth, and Twentieth Congresses (March 4, 1823 – March 4, 1829). He served as chairman of the Committee on Revisal and Unfinished Business (Nineteenth Congress).

He was appointed by President Andrew Jackson as Minister Plenipotentiary to Gran Colombia March 13, 1829, and served until April 16, 1833. He returned to Kentucky.

He was presented credentials as a member-elect to the Twenty-third Congress, but the election was contested by Robert P. Letcher and the House declared a new election necessary. He was appointed lieutenant colonel of the 3rd U.S. Dragoons in the war with Mexico and served from March 3, 1847, to July 31, 1848. He served as delegate to the Kentucky constitutional convention in 1849 and 1850.

He died in Harrodsburg, Kentucky, July 21, 1853.

References

 

1797 births
1853 deaths
People from Charlotte County, Virginia
Democratic-Republican Party members of the United States House of Representatives from Kentucky
Jacksonian members of the United States House of Representatives from Kentucky
Members of the Kentucky House of Representatives
American slave owners
19th-century American diplomats
Transylvania University alumni
United States Army officers
American military personnel of the War of 1812
American military personnel of the Mexican–American War